Bernard Chambers (1903–1936) was an English footballer who played in the Football League for Mansfield Town and Rotherham United.

References

1903 births
1936 deaths
English footballers
English Football League players
Nottingham Forest F.C. players
Rotherham United F.C. players
Boston Town F.C. (1920s) players
Mansfield Town F.C. players
People from Bramcote
Footballers from Nottinghamshire
Association football defenders